Attorney General Hartigan may refer to:

John Patrick Hartigan (1887–1968), Attorney General of Rhode Island
Neil Hartigan (born 1938), Attorney General of Illinois